Biswajit Ghosh (born 8 April 1958) is a Bangladeshi professor, essayist and researcher. He is a professor of the Bangla Department at Dhaka University and Incumbent Vice-Chancellor of the Rabindra University. He was awarded Bangla Academy Literary Award in 2011 and Ekushey Padak in 2019 for his contributions in research.

Early life
Ghosh was born on 8 April 1958 at Kamarkathi village in Barisal of the then East Pakistan (now Bangladesh). He earned his PhD from Dhaka University in 1995.

Career
Ghosh started his career as a lecturer at the Bangla Department of Dhaka University on 1 February 1984. He has been appointed by the Ministry of Education as the first Vice Chancellor of Rabindra University on 11 June 2017 for four years. He wrote and edited more than 50 books.

Awards and recognition
 Ibrahim Memorial Gold Medal (2017)
 Madhusudan National Medal
 Abdur Rab Chowdhury Memorial Gold Medal
 Enamul Haque Gold Medal
 Bangla Academy Literary Award (2011)
 Ekushey Padak (2019)

References

1958 births
Living people
People from Barisal District
University of Dhaka alumni
Academic staff of the University of Dhaka
Bangladeshi Hindus
Recipients of the Ekushey Padak
Recipients of Bangla Academy Award